Sex differences in medicine include sex-specific diseases or conditions which occur only in people of one sex due to underlying biological factors (for example, prostate cancer in males or uterine cancer in females); sex-related diseases, which are diseases that are more common to one sex (for example, breast cancer and systemic lupus erythematosus which occur predominantly in females); and diseases which occur at similar rates in males and females but manifest differently according to sex (for example, peripheral artery disease).

Sex differences should not be confused with gender differences. The US National Academy of Medicine recognizes sex differences as biological at the chromosomal and anatomical levels, whereas gender differences are based on self-representation and other factors including biology, environment and experience.
That said, both biological and behavioural differences influence human health, and may do so differentially. Such factors can be inter-related and difficult to separate. Evidence-based approaches to sex and gender medicine try to examine the effects of both sex and gender as factors when dealing with medical conditions that may affect populations differently.

, over 10,000 articles had been published addressing sex and gender differences in clinical medicine and related literature. Sex and gender affect cardiovascular, 
pulmonary 
and autoimmune systems, 
gastroenterology, 
hepatology, 
nephrology, 
endocrinology, 
haematology,
neurology,
pharmacokinetics, and pharmacodynamics.

Sexually transmitted diseases, which have a significant probability of transmission through sexual contact, can be contracted by either sex. Their occurrence may reflect economic and social as well as biological factors, leading to sex differences  in the transmission, prevalence, and disease burden of STDs.

Historically, medical research has primarily been conducted using the male body as the basis for clinical studies. The findings of these studies have often been applied across the sexes, and healthcare providers have traditionally assumed a uniform approach in treating both male and female patients. More recently, medical research has started to understand the importance of taking sex into account as evidence increases that the symptoms and responses to medical treatment may be very different between sexes.

Background

Females and males exhibit many differences in terms of risk of developing disease, receiving an accurate diagnosis, and responding to treatments. A patient's sex has been increasingly recognized as one of the most important modulators of clinical decision making. Sex differences have been found across a broad range of disease areas, including many diseases which are sex-specific. The sex chromosome complement and sex hormone environment are known to be the primary constitutive difference between females and males. The imbalance of gene expression between the X and Y chromosomes is present within virtually all cells in the human body. Sex hormones are crucial in body development and function and also thought to contribute to sex differences in some diseases. It is suspected that many differences between the sexes are also influenced by social, environmental, and psychological factors which are difficult to tease apart from biological ones.

Causes
Sex-related illnesses have various causes:
 Genetic sex differences start at conception depending on whether an ovum fuses with a sperm cell carrying an X or a Y chromosome. This leads to sex-based differences at the molecular level for all male and female cells.
  In males, the X chromosome carries only maternal imprints, while in females  X chromosomes are present with both maternal and paternal imprints. In female cells, random processes of X-inactivation "turn off" the extra X chromosome. As a result, females, but not males, are mosaics. Female cells may express higher levels of some genes.
 Sex differences at the chromosome and molecular level exist in all human cells, and persist life-long, independent of sex hormones in the body.
  Sex-linked genetic conditions that differ in males and females may reflect the effects of genetic damage on an X chromosome. In some cases, the presence of an "extra" X chromosome in female cells may lessen the impact of such damage. In severe cases, males may die during development and females may survive but display a sex-linked illness.
 The reproductive system develops differently for each sex.  Sex-specific parts of the male and female reproductive systems affect the rest of the body and also can be affected differently by diseases.
 Socially constructed norms relate to gender roles, relationships, positional power, and a wide variety of behaviours.  Norms affect people differentially depending on their sex and gender.
 Different levels of prevention, reporting, diagnosis, and treatment have been observed based on sex and gender.

Examples of sex-related illnesses and disorders in humans

Females
Examples of sex-related illnesses and disorders in human females:

 99% of breast cancer occurs in women.
 Ovarian cancer, endometriosis and other diseases affect the female reproductive system.
 Females are more likely to experience severe outcomes from viral respiratory tract infections during their reproductive years, compared to males of the same age. In response to treatment, females may develop greater immune responses but may also experience more adverse reactions than males.
 Approximately four times more women have osteoporosis than men.
 Autoimmune diseases, such as Sjögren's syndrome and scleroderma, are more prevalent in women. Roughly 70% of those living with autoimmune diseases are female. See Sex differences in autoimmunity.
 While estimates vary widely, eating disorders are estimated to affect as high as 13% of women in some age groups  and 3% of men in Western cultures, with  anorexia nervosa affecting 10 women for each man and bulimia nervosa affecting 8 women for each man.
 Alzheimer's disease has a higher incidence in females compared to males. There are also phenotypic differences, with females displaying more cognitive deficits. Females are also more likely to have neurofibrillary tangles present on autopsy.
 Huntington's disease affects females and males differently. Females have faster disease progression, and display symptoms with fewer trinucleotide repeats. 
 About two times more women than men have unipolar clinical depression (although bipolar disorder appears to affect both sexes equally).
 About three times more women than men are diagnosed with borderline or histrionic personality disorder.
Conditions such as chronic fatigue syndrome (CFS)/myalgic encephalomyelitis (ME), postural orthostatic tachycardia syndrome (POTS), fibromyalgia, irritable bowel syndrome (IBS) and idiopathic hypersomnia, which have unclear causes, are more common in women, with sex ratios ranging from 2:1 in IBS, fibromyalgia, and idiopathic hypersomnia to 4:1 in CFS, and 5:1 in POTS.
Most people with psychogenic non-epileptic seizures (PNES) (75%) are female.
Ataxic cerebral palsy is more common in women and girls.
Turner Syndrome only occurs in females.

Males
Examples of sex-related illnesses and disorders in male humans:

 Prostate cancer, testicular cancer and other diseases of the male reproductive system occur in men.
 Diseases of X-linked recessive inheritance, such as colour blindness, occur more frequently in men, and haemophilia A and B occur almost exclusively in men.
 The presence of a single X chromosome in males (rather than two in females) may explain why males are more susceptible to genetic diseases linked to the X chromosome, including hemophilia, Duchenne muscular dystrophy, and Hunter syndrome.
 Certain neurodegenerative diseases (Parkinson's disease (2:1 ratio) and Lewy body dementia (4:1 ratio)) are more prevalent in males. Parkinson's also displays phenotypic differences: males are more likely to present with sleep disturbances and deficits in verbal fluency and facial expression.
 Abdominal aortic aneurysms are six times more common in men, and thus some countries have introduced screening for males at risk of developing the condition.
 Autism is approximately four times more prevalent in males than females. Males also have distinct autism phenotypes compared to females, including a higher prevalence of restrictive and repetitive behaviors.
Males have increased risk of dyskinetic cerebral palsy and spastic diplegia, as well as lower limb deformities.
Schizophrenia is about 1.4 times as common in males, and on average starts two years earlier and has more severe symptoms.
 More than two times more men than women are affected by antisocial personality disorder and substance use disorder.
Several cancers, including stomach cancer (2:1), oesophageal cancer (3:1), liver cancer (2:1 to 4:1) and oral cancer (2:1 to 3:1), which have mostly lifestyle-based risk factors, are more common in men.
 Males are more likely to experience severe outcomes from viral respiratory tract infections than females, at younger and older ages.
 Tuberculosis is more common in men.
 In cases of preterm birth, being male is associated with higher mortality and morbidity in terms of respiratory distress, cardiovascular disorders (specifically hypotension), neurodevelopmental disorders, and immune disorders.
 Although both males and females can have eating disorders, males are less likely to be diagnosed and receive treatment.
 Klinefelter syndrome (karyotype XXY) is the most common sex chromosome aneuploidy (occurring in ~152/100,000 births, only in males). It is often subclinical, but can cause infertility, tall stature, gynecomastia (enlargement of the breast tissue), limited facial and body hair, and small firm testicles.

See also 

 Andrology
 Gynaecology
 Health equity
 Men's health
 Obstetrics and gynecology
 Reproductive medicine
 Sex differences in humans
 Women's health

References 

Human diseases and disorders
Medicine